Chubasco is a 1968 American drama film written and directed by Allen H. Miner. The film stars Richard Egan, Christopher Jones, Susan Strasberg, Ann Sothern, Simon Oakland and Audrey Totter. The film was released by Warner Bros.-Seven Arts on June 5, 1968.

Plot

Cast 
Richard Egan as Sebastian
Christopher Jones as Chubasco
Susan Strasberg as Bunny
Ann Sothern as Angela
Simon Oakland as Laurindo
Audrey Totter as Theresa
Preston Foster as Nick
Peter Whitney as Matt
Edward Binns as Judge North
Joe De Santis as Benito
Norman Alden as Frenchy
Stewart Moss as Les
Ron Rich as Juno
Milton Frome as Police Sergeant
Ernest Sarracino as Juan
Suzanne Benoit as Edna Belle
Lili Valenty as Maria

References

External links
 

1968 films
1960s coming-of-age drama films
American coming-of-age drama films
Films about fishing
Films scored by William Lava
Films set in California
Seafaring films
Warner Bros. films
1968 drama films
1960s English-language films
1960s American films